Drakes Supermarkets is a privately owned Australian independent retail chain based in South Australia.

Named after Roger Drake who opened the first store in Mitcham, Adelaide in 1974, Drakes has since expanded to become Australia's largest independent supermarket chain, operating over 60 stores in South Australia and Queensland. Drakes has an online shopping website which delivers groceries from eight stores in South Australia and one store in Queensland. It also has an online store for corporate platters called "Drakes' Little Site of Platters".

Drakes also operates two newsagencies and three Cellarbrations liquor stores in South Australia.

As of 2013 the company had an annual turnover of AUS $1 billion. The company employs over 5,500 staff nationally and was the largest owner of Foodland stores until it split from the brand in 2019.

History

Establishment 
Drakes Supermarkets began trading in 1974 when Roger Drake, a former Coles/Myer manager, started his own three-aisle supermarket in Mitcham. Known as Jack and Jill's, he bought the store for only $29,000 and employed four people.

That store proved successful and in 1977, he bought his second store at Torrensville. This was his first full-size supermarket.

Growth 
Drake continued to expand his chain. By 2005 he owned 27 Foodland stores in SA as well as 3 Timesavers stores, six Queensland stores, four newsagencies, a liquor outlet and a large property portfolio. This speedy expansion was enabled by the purchase of Davids and Franklins supermarkets in SA as well as the purchase of six Queensland stores between August and October 2004.

In 2006, Drakes obtained the rare benefit of being exempted from WorkCover.

In 2013 Drakes announced the development of a new meat processing centre at Beverley in Adelaide, South Australia. The centre, expected to cost  $10 million, enabled quality control of Drakes meat products and greater efficiencies. The following year, Drakes' annual turnover reached $1 billion in its 40th year of operation.

In 2014 Drakes bought out Wilson's Fresh Produce based in Rocklea, Brisbane. The company had been its Queensland fruit and vegetable supplier for ten years, a relationship that doubled Wilson's sales.  Wilson's was rebranded It's Fresh Queensland and the existing wholesale customers were retained. Earlier, Drakes bought out one of its South Australian fresh produce suppliers to form It's Fresh South Australia. Drakes continues to own It's Fresh.

As at 2018, Drakes Supermarkets turned over $1 billion a year and employed 5,500 people.  Roger Drake continues to own the business.

Re-branding 
The majority of Drakes Supermarkets originally operated under Metcash's Foodland, IGA or Supa IGA brands. Other stores operated as Timesavers.

From November 2017, Drake's Queensland Supa IGA stores were rebranded as Drakes. In 2019, all South Australian stores were also rebranded to remove Foodland branding and become Drakes Supermarkets.

Drakes distribution centre
In May 2018 Drakes Supermarkets announced the building of a new $80 million distribution centre in Adelaide's northern suburbs at Edinburgh North, ending its contract with grocery supplier Metcash in June 2019. Drakes already operated its own fruit and vegetable distribution centre, It's Fresh, in Pooraka and meat distribution centre at Beverley. The new distribution centre will not take over supplying Drakes supermarkets in South Australia until the end of September 2019, and Drakes has a new 5 year contract with Metcash for its Queensland stores. The official opening of the new facility was held on 26 September 2019.

Supermarket types 

Drakes Supermarkets operates stores in a number of different formats.

Standard format 
The standard Drakes Supermarket is a medium-sized supermarket, slightly smaller than those operated by Coles or Woolworths. These stores stock a broad range of grocery items, fruit and vegetables, bakery goods, meat, frozen and dairy products and delicatessen goods.

Market stores 
In 2015, Drakes opened a Market store format, with one in South Australia, one at Alice Plaza in the Northern Territory, and one in Queensland. These stores are quite small and as such, can take advantage of the longer shopping hours available to smaller stores in South Australia. These stores still stock a wide variety of consumer goods with a focus on organic, vegetarian and vegan food.

Fruit sheds 
Drake's fruit shed opened first in Queensland at Caboolture and Parkinson. South Australia's first fruit shed was set up in the Drake's  Foodland at Seaford in Adelaide's south in October 2018. , and second Fruit Shed was set up in the new Murray Bridge store in April 2019. These supermarkets sell imperfect fresh produce at reduced prices.

New concept store 
In 2018, Drakes opened a new concept store at Wayville in South Australia. The store has a completely new layout including popcorn machine, orange juice machine, kombucha taps and hot food available from the service deli. The concept has proven popular, with Collinswood and Salisbury also taking on similar styling as the Wayville store.

Other operations 
Drakes Supermarkets operates its own meat centres, at Parkinson in Queensland and Beverley in South Australia. It supplies its own fruit and vegetables through It's Fresh, also in both states.

Drakes operates two newsagencies in Adelaide, as well as three Cellarbrations liquor stores.

Controversies 
Between 2014 and 2020, Drakes Supermarkets underpaid their managerial staff by $1.5 million, which they settled to repay along with $590,000 in penalties and interest.

Community initiatives

Community Dollars 
Drakes Supermarkets has a unique community funding programme called Community Dollars. Volunteer organisations that join the programme receive tags to pass on to members who shop at Drakes supermarkets. 1c in every $1 spent at a Drakes store in South Australia and 2c in Queensland is donated to the nominated charity when the tags are presented at checkout. This programme has seen over $500,000 between 2018-2020 donated to non-profit groups across both states.

Drakes Charity Showbags 
Drakes co-operates with suppliers and Bedford Group to annually release the Drakes Charity Showbags in-store during the Royal Adelaide Show. All profits raised are divided between five charities - Bedford Group (Phoenix Society), Royal District Nursing Service, The Queen Elizabeth Hospital Research Foundation, Flinders Medical Centre Breast Cancer Research and St John's Ambulance. In 2018-2020, over $250,000 was raised and 47,000 bags sold through this initiative.

See also

List of supermarket chains in Oceania

References

External links

Australian companies established in 1974
Retail companies established in 1974
Supermarkets of Australia
Companies based in South Australia